"Right Place, Right Time" is the 22nd episode of the fourth season of How I Met Your Mother and 86th overall. It aired on May 4, 2009.

Plot 
Future Ted (Bob Saget) describes to his children a day near the beginning of his struggling solo architecture career, where a set of circumstances began his journey to meet their mother. The cold open shows Ted walking down his street with a yellow umbrella, stopping at a newsstand, giving some cash to a homeless man, and stopping at a crosswalk before a woman's hand reaches over and touches his shoulder.

Going backwards, Future Ted describes his desperation when he began doing solo architect work. Ted takes a job from a chain restaurant company to design a building shaped like a Stetson hat. When he complains to Robin about his lack of inspiration, she tells him to get out of the house and clear his head. He agrees to go out for a bagel, and Robin tells him to take an umbrella because her station's clown weatherman said it would rain. As he comes down the steps, he turns right, but then turns left.

Ted explains that a few days ago, Robin vomited into a local woman's silk purse on her show because of food poisoning she got from one of Ted's favorite restaurants, Schlegel's Bagels. Ted turns the other way outside his apartment to go to his second favorite bagel place.

At MacLaren's, Barney finds a copy of Bro's Life, and proceeds to go to Ted's apartment. Barney then shows Ted the magazine and notes that he will be going out with a supermodel featured in the issue (Petra Petrova). Barney declares that he is about to meet his goal of having sex with 200 women. He credits the number to an argument he had back in junior high. A bully named Matthew Panning taunted the young Barney, saying he had been with "a hundred girls", and Barney retorted that he would be with 200 women some day.

Unfortunately, as Robin checks over his list, she notices he has listed a woman twice, leaving Barney at woman number 198, not 199. He runs to his gym and sleeps with a female bodybuilder to get him up to 199, but when he returns to the bar, Robin tells him that the list uses a number twice, so the bodybuilder was actually number 200. Ted stops at the newsstand to check out the bodybuilding magazine Muscle Sexxy that Barney's number 200 is featured in.

During the discussion of Barney's 200 sexual conquests (which most of the other characters cite as "too many"), Marshall takes the conversation as an opportunity to take out some professionally made charts, showing Barney's low "batting average" noting that only 1.2 percent of the women he approaches actually have sex with him. This leads into Marshall's addiction to the charts that the GNB graphics department make up for him, including a list of presidents' last names by order of innuendo (complete with a "Filmore" misspelling), a Venn diagram based on Simon and Garfunkel's "Cecilia". Eventually, the gang pulls out the Intervention banner, causing Marshall to pull out a chart to refute their claims of sagging interest in the charts. After the intervention, Marshall discovers the gang threw away all his charts, including the ones necessary for an important meeting on tax shelters.

Ted agrees to retrieve the charts, but finds them in the possession of an odd homeless man called Milt (Dan Castellaneta), who agrees to sell them for one million dollars. Ted negotiates to pay him on a dollar-a-day basis. After stopping at the newsstand, Ted crosses the street to give the man a dollar, and continues down the street to a crosswalk. As he waits he is tapped on the shoulder by a woman's hand. Future Ted talks about how fate is a funny thing, and that has control over your life, which is scary, but also beautiful, and that if anything had happened differently, the children wouldn't be there. He says that if he knew where all those circumstances were leading him, he would have gone back and thanked everyone involved, and in a montage Ted imagines going back and hugging everyone in the episode. The camera then turns to reveal that Stella is the woman behind Ted at the crosswalk.

Afterwards, Barney is at the bar, sitting with a grown-up Matthew Panning, gloating over his success. Panning is happily married with kids, and is not the bullying jerk he once was. Panning is shocked that Barney has spent his adult life outdoing a lie he told in middle school and feels sorry for Barney; Barney refuses to let it mar his victory. After he leaves, Barney tears up the list, stating that he wonders what he'll do next. He then turns to see Robin at the bar.

Production 
Writer Chris Harris used to work on Late Show with David Letterman alongside the creators of How I Met Your Mother Craig Thomas and Carter Bays. In this episode, Harris used a bit originally written for Letterman's "Charts and Graphs" section that was never used.

Critical response 

Donna Bowman of The A.V. Club rated the episode B+. Michelle Zoromski of IGN gave the episode 8.5 out of 10.

References

External links 
 

How I Met Your Mother (season 4) episodes
2009 American television episodes